Conny Karlsson (born 21 November 1953) is a Swedish football manager who lastly coached the women's team of Stattena IF.

Career
Born in Oskarshamn, he played for local club IFK Oskarshamn before moving to Swedish giants IFK Göteborg, where he won the 1981–82 UEFA Cup. After a short stint with the Toronto Blizzard, he ended his playing career at Örgryte IS. He was capped 5 times for Sweden.

He began his coaching career at Örgryte IS, first as an assistant-coach, then as first-team coach. He also managed Landskrona BoIS (which he got promoted to Allsvenskan in 1993), HamKam, FK Haugesund, Kalmar FF, Assyriska Föreningen, Trelleborgs FF, Sarpsborg 08 FF and Helsingborgs IF.

After winning Allsvenskan with Helsingborgs IF in 2011, Karlsson decided to withdraw as head coach on 14 June 2012 and was replaced by Åge Hareide.

Personal life
His twin brother, Jerry, is also a former footballer.

References

1953 births
Living people
Swedish footballers
Swedish expatriate footballers
Sweden international footballers
IFK Göteborg players
Toronto Blizzard (1971–1984) players
Örgryte IS players
Swedish football managers
Örgryte IS managers
Landskrona BoIS managers
FK Haugesund managers
Hamarkameratene managers
Kalmar FF managers
Assyriska FF managers
Trelleborgs FF managers
Sarpsborg 08 FF managers
Helsingborgs IF managers
North American Soccer League (1968–1984) players
Expatriate soccer players in Canada
Swedish expatriate sportspeople in Canada
UEFA Cup winning players
Association football defenders